Gisela Duarte Casas  (born ) is a retired Peruvian volleyball player. She was part of the Peru women's national volleyball team.

She participated in the 1994 FIVB Volleyball Women's World Championship. On club level she played with Latino Amisa.

Clubs
 Latino Amisa (1994)

References

1977 births
Living people
Peruvian women's volleyball players
Place of birth missing (living people)
20th-century Peruvian women